Menzies' echymipera (Echymipera echinista), or Menzies' spiny bandicoot or Fly River bandicoot, is a species of marsupial in the family Peramelidae. It is endemic to Papua New Guinea.

References

Peramelemorphs
Mammals of Papua New Guinea
Mammals described in 1990
Taxonomy articles created by Polbot
Marsupials of New Guinea